is a Japanese film director. He began his career working on documentaries at Iwanami Productions but, after going independent, turned to fiction film. He won the Directors Guild of Japan New Directors Award for Yasashii Nipponjin in 1971, and then the award for Best Director at the 17th Hochi Film Awards for The River with No Bridge.

In 1996, he won the Silver Bear for an outstanding single achievement at the 46th Berlin International Film Festival for the film Village of Dreams.

Filmography
 Yasashii Nipponjin (1971)
 Third Base (1978)
 Mo hozue wa tsukanai (1979)
 Shiki Natsuko (1980)
 Keshin (1986)
 Ureshi Hazukashi Monogatari (1988)
 The River with No Bridge (1992)
 Village of Dreams (1996)
 Dareka no Mokkin (2016)

External links

References

1934 births
Living people
Japanese film directors
Japanese documentary filmmakers